Thomas Witherow (1824–1890) was an Irish Presbyterian minister and historian.

Life
The son of Hugh Witherow, a farmer at Aughlish, near Dungiven, County Londonderry, and his wife Elizabeth Martin, he was born at Ballycastle on 29 May 1824. He received his early education at Ralliagh church school, and then studied with James Bryce. Later on he went to Belfast Academy and the Royal Academical Institution.

In 1839 he entered the collegiate department of the Academical Institution, and here, with the exception of a session at Edinburgh, all his college days were spent.

In 1845 Witherow was licensed to preach by the presbytery of Glendermot, and in 1845 he was ordained at Maghera, Londonderry, by the presbytery of Magherafelt, as colleague to Charles Kennedy. In 1865, on the opening of Magee College, Londonderry, he was appointed by the General Assembly as Professor of Church History and Pastoral Theology. He served as curator of the College's library and museum between at least 1869-70 and 1888-89.

In 1878 Witherow was elected moderator of the Irish General Assembly, and in 1884 as a senator of the Royal University of Ireland. He was made hon. D.D. in 1883 by the Presbyterian Theological Faculty, Ireland, and LL.D. by the Royal University in 1885.

Witherow died on 25 January 1890 at Londonderry, and was buried in the city cemetery there.

Works
Witherow's main works were:

 Three Prophets of our own, 1855.
 The Apostolic Church—which is it?, 1856. A Reply was published in 1867 by Rev. Thomas G. Porter
 [https://books.google.com/books?id=GA-mmLRejuUC&q=intitle:A+intitle:Defence+intitle:of+intitle:the+intitle:Apostolic+intitle:Church+intitle:including+intitle:an+intitle:examination+intitle:of+intitle:the+intitle:claims+intitle:of+intitle:independency Defence of the Apostolic Church], 1857.
 Scriptural Baptism; its Mode and Subjects, 1859.
 An inquiry into the scriptural form of Church government. Extracted and abridged from 'The Apostolic Church, 1867
 The New Testament Elder: His position, powers and duties in the Christian Church, 1873
 Derry and Enniskillen in the year 1689, 1873.
 The Boyne and Aghrim, 1879.
 Historical and Literary Memorials of Presbyterianism in Ireland (1623–1800), 2 vols. Vol 1, 1623-1731, Vol 2, 1731-1800, 1879.
 History of the Reformation; a primer, 1882.
 Life of Rev. A. P. Goudy, D.D., begun by Thomas Croskery, 1887.
 Two Diaries of Derry in 1689, being Richards's Diary of the Fleet and Ash's Journal of the Siege, with Introduction and Notes, 1888.
 The Form of the Christian Temple, 1889.

He was a contributor to the British and Foreign Evangelical Review, the Belfast Witness, and the Londonderry Standard, and was one of the editors of the Presbyterian Review''.

Family
Witherow married Catharine, daughter of Thomas Milling of Maghera. They had seven daughters and three sons.

Notes

 
Attribution
 

1824 births
1890 deaths
Irish Presbyterian ministers
19th-century Irish historians
People from County Londonderry
Moderators of the Presbyterian Church in Ireland
Academics of Ulster University